Makram Ebeid Pasha (25 October 1889 – 5 June 1961) was an Egyptian Coptic politician. Ebeid was the Wafd Party secretary-general between 1936 and 1942. He was also the Minister of Finance 1930, 1936–1937, 1942. Ebeid helped establish the Wafd Party in Egypt, and he believed in liberal politics. He was involved in the 1919 revolution with his friend Saad Zaghloul and was one of the people who were exiled as a punishment, but he eventually returned to Egypt with some of the noblemen of that time.

Family history and early life 
Ebeid came from a prestigious well-known family in Qina, Upper Egypt. His father was involved in construction work of the railway from Nag Hammadi to Luxor, the completion of which led to being granted the title of bey from the khedive. The family was involved with politics even when Napoleon tried to conquer Egypt, and they were among those who welcomed Napoleon and became his allies. They were continuously praised among the Egyptian people because of their absolute devotion to the country. Though among the wealthiest families of Egypt, they were known to balance both the humble life of the commoners and their noble life with their personal relations to the King.

Makram Ebeid was born William Makram Ebeid, one of seven children. His first name, "William", was later dropped due political concerns with the British protectorate in Egypt.  He was noted as one of the brightest of the family, and his education took place at American College in Asyut. Later, Ebeid studied law at The University of Oxford from 1905–1908, one of the youngest ever to be admitted in the college. After graduating, Ebeid moved to France for two years to study Egyptology, and eventually, returned to Egypt.

Rise in Wafd Party 
Ebeid returned to Egypt in the midst of nationalistic unrest, and began to involve himself in the Wafd party's struggle for independence led by Saad Zaghloul. The Wafd party called for a delegation, or wafd, to travel to the Peace Conference following the end of World War 1 seeking the means to acquire independence. This request was refused, and the Wafd party eventually turned into a political party following the Unilateral Declaration of Egyptian Independence in 1922, soon beginning to campaign for internal autonomy, constitutional government, civil rights, and Egyptian control of both the Sudan and the Suez Canal. Zaghloul, impressed by Ebeid's intelligence and eloquence, declared him his political son and supporter, marking Ebeid's rise in the ranks of the Wafd party. During this time, Ebeid rejected his father's Protestantism and embraced Coptic Christianity. He was one of the signatories to the Anglo-Egyptian Treaty of 1936.

Criticism of Wafd Party and political decline 

Following the death of Saad Zaghloul, the Wafd party began to see a rise in corruption, and a change of guard under new leader Mostafa El-Nahas. Ebeid warned of the rise in corruption within the party and pitfalls under Nahas' leadership in his Black Book, and ended up breaking away from the Wafd party in 1942, forming his own political block, Hizb al-Kutlah al-Wafdiyyah. The rise of disunity and corruption within the ranks of the Wafd marked the decline of Ebeid's position in the political scene.

Relationship with the Muslim Brotherhood 

Ebeid had a cordial relationship with Hassan al-Banna, founder of the Muslim Brotherhood. He was one of two men allowed to attend the latter's funeral along with his father in February 1949, as being a government figure, meanwhile any other man would be arrested.

Death 
Ebeid died on 5 June 1961, and was eulogized at the Saint Mark's Coptic Orthodox Cathedral, Azbakeya, Cairo.

Legacy 
Makram Ebeid has a street in Egypt named after him, and is taught as one of the main heroes of Egypt in history books, he and his family played a major role in forming Egypt's Golden Age. The family to this day is well known among the elite politicians, they are involved in a lot of charity and continue to support liberal politics.

References 
 

1889 births
1961 deaths
Egyptian people of Coptic descent
Coptic politicians
People from Qena
Wafd Party politicians
Finance Ministers of Egypt
Egyptian pashas
Supply and internal trade ministers of Egypt